Artyom Vaszjunyin (born January 26, 1984) is a Ukrainian-Hungarian former professional ice hockey player.

Career statistics

Austrian Hockey League

References

External links

1984 births
Fehérvár AV19 players
Dunaújvárosi Acélbikák players
Ferencvárosi TC (ice hockey) players
Ukrainian ice hockey right wingers
Hungarian ice hockey players
Living people
Sportspeople from Kyiv